Government Post Graduate College Mardan is a public sector college located in Mardan, Khyber Pakhtunkhwa, Pakistan. The college offers programs for intermediate level in Science, Arts and General Science group and affiliated with Board of Intermediate and Secondary Education Mardan. The college also offers 4 years BS programs in various disciplines for which it is affiliated with Abdul Wali Khan University Mardan.

History 
Government Post Graduate College Mardan was established on 14 December 1952 by Governor of Khyber Pakhtunkhwa Khawja Shahab ud Din. At the start it was intermediate college and was called Akbar Memorial College after the name of wealthy family in Mardan, who provided the free land for the college. Later it became a Degree college and became Government College Mardan after purchasing the land.

Departments
 Department of Mathematics
 Department of Physics
 Department of Computer Science
 Department of Zoology
 Department of Botany
 Department of Chemistry
 Department of English
 Department of Urdu
 Department of Pashto
 Department of Economics
 Department of Political Science
 Department of Sociology
 Department of Statistics
 Department of History
 Department of Islamiyat
 Department of Geography

See also 
 Abdul Wali Khan University Mardan
 Women University Mardan
 Government Degree College No.02 Mardan

References

External links 
 Government Post Graduate College Mardan Official Website

Mardan District
Mardan
Public universities and colleges in Khyber Pakhtunkhwa
Educational institutions established in 1952
1952 establishments in Pakistan